The Destruction of Sodom and Gomorrah is a painting by the English painter John Martin from 1852.

John Martin's painting, shows the biblical story of the destruction of the two cities of Sodom and Gomorrah, which was God's punishment for the two cities for people's immoral behavior. Only Lot and his daughters were saved. Lot's wife disobeyed God's instruction not to look back, and was turned into a pillar of salt. The fiery red color is characteristic of John Martin's dramatic scenes of destruction. The swirling storm in heaven was also a frequent feature of his paintings.

Description
It is 136.3 x 212.3 cm. in size.
It is in the collection of the Laing Art Gallery in Newcastle upon Tyne.

Apocalyptic theme 
Several other of Martin's paintings contain apocalyptic tendencies, including the Fall of Babylon (1831), The Fall of Nineveh, Divine vengeance, Pandemonium (1841) and The Eve of the Deluge (1840).

Artist 
Many regarded Martin while he lived as a great British artist, surpassed only by his older contemporary colleague J. M. W. Turner, who he had a competition with for recognition. But John Martin's reputation declined after his death.

References

External links 
 The Destruction of Sodom and Gomorrah, Martin, John – Europeana

1852 paintings
Paintings by John Martin
Sodom and Gomorrah
Paintings in North East England
Paintings of Lot (biblical person)